The 2005–06 season was Galatasaray's 102nd in existence and the 48th consecutive season in the Süper Lig. This article shows statistics of the club's players in the season, and also lists all matches that the club have played in the season.
The season also saw a first in Turkish football; for the first time in history the team that entered the last week first, Fenerbahçe, failed to win the title. Fenerbahçe and Galatasaray went into the last week deadlocked at 80 points and Fenerbahçe had a better head-to-head record. Fenerbahçe needed only a win to defend their title and win their third successive championship. However, a 1-1 draw to Denizlispor combined with a 3-0 Galatasaray win against Kayserispor gave Galatasaray their 16th league title.

Squad statistics

Players in / out

Süper Lig

Standings

Türkiye Kupası

Group stage

Quarter-final

UEFA Cup

First round

Friendlies

Attendance

References

Galatasaray S.K. (football) seasons
Galatasaray S.K.
2005–06 in Turkish football
Turkish football championship-winning seasons
2000s in Istanbul
Galatasaray Sports Club 2005–06 season